The American Patriot Supercruiser, also called the Patriot II, is an American amateur-built aircraft, that was designed and produced by American Patriot Aircraft of Westfield, Wisconsin. The aircraft was intended to be supplied as a kit for amateur construction.

While the aircraft was still offered for sale in April 2011 the company appears to have gone out of business in late 2011, having completed only the prototype.

Design and development
The Supercruiser features a strut-braced high-wing, two-seats in side-by-side configuration in an enclosed egg-shaped cockpit accessed via doors, a twin tail, fixed tricycle landing gear and a single engine in pusher configuration.

The aircraft is made from aluminum sheet.

The company had indicated that they were pursuing light-sport aircraft certification in 2011, but as of September 2016, the design does not appear on the Federal Aviation Administration's list of approved special light-sport aircraft.

By December 2011 only one example, the prototype, was listed as completed. The US Federal Aviation Administration indicates that its registration expired on 30 September 2012 and was not renewed.

Specifications (Patriot Supercruiser)

References

External links
Archives of the company website on Archive.org

Homebuilt aircraft
Single-engined pusher aircraft